Darling Anatole (French: Anatole chéri) is a 1954 French comedy film directed by Claude Heymann and starring Alice Field, Paul Demange and Jim Gérald. It is based on a comic strip by Albert Dubout. Demange had previously played the role of Anatole in Street Without a King (1950).

Cast
   Alice Field as Caroline  
 Paul Demange as Anatole  
 Jim Gérald as Mme Anatole  
 Fernand Gilbert as Sparadra  
 Christine Carère  
 René Hell as Le docteur  
 Jacqueline Noëlle  as Lolotte  
 Mériel 
 Pierre Gallon 
 Lina Roxa 
 Denise Kerny 
 Georges Sauval 
 Anne-Marie Mersen

References

Bibliography 
 Parish, Robert. Film Actors Guide. Scarecrow Press, 1977.

External links 
 

1954 films
1954 comedy films
French comedy films
1950s French-language films
Films directed by Claude Heymann
Films based on French comics
Live-action films based on comics
French sequel films
French black-and-white films
1950s French films